Nostradamus is the sixteenth studio album by English heavy metal band Judas Priest, focusing on the 16th-century writer Nostradamus. It is a double album and the band's first concept album. It was originally intended to be released in late 2006 before being pushed back to a 2007 release, and was finally released on 17 June 2008 on Epic Records. It is the last Judas Priest studio album to feature the Painkiller-era lineup with guitarist and founding member K. K. Downing retiring in April 2011.

Judas Priest toured with Motörhead, Heaven & Hell, and Testament on the Metal Masters Tour to promote Nostradamus. The band also performed a world tour in 2008 and 2009 in support of the album.

Development
The Nostradamus concept idea originated from manager Bill Curbishley and was pitched to the band while on tour in Estonia in 2005. Guitarist K. K. Downing revealed in a February 2007 interview with Brave Words & Bloody Knuckles that 18 tracks had been recorded with a total length of more than 90 minutes and that there was not much he would like to cut down. Musically, the album contains symphonic orchestrations, including the use of keyboards and choirs, which is unlike anything the band has previously attempted. In November 2007, the band began mixing the album.

Release
In November 2007, singer Rob Halford indicated that it was still undecided whether it would be a double-disc set or not. In April 2008, it was confirmed that the album would be released as a double-CD/triple vinyl LP.

"Nostradamus" sold 42,000 copies in the United States in its first week of release to debut at position No. 11 on The Billboard 200 chart. This was the band's highest-ever chart position in the US before being surpassed by Redeemer of Souls in 2014, when it took the No. 6 position. According to Billboard.com, the album was released in Europe on 16 June 2008 and 17 June in United States. Three configurations of Nostradamus have been issued. The most common is a regular jewel-cased double CD, but there is also a "CD deluxe hardbound version", which features a 48-page booklet, while a "super deluxe version" includes three vinyl records (in addition to the CD deluxe packaging, plus a poster).

The title track was released on 12 April 2008 as a free download on Judas Priest's website through Epic Records. The second single "Visions" was released on 4 May 2008.

The title track was nominated for Best Metal Performance at the 51st Grammy Awards. The song "Visions" was also nominated for a Grammy in the category Best Hard Rock Performance.

The band has repeatedly made mention of a desire to perform the album in full, as part of a theatrical production, but the idea was scrapped, possibly due to the album's lukewarm reception by fans. Only two of the album's songs were performed live on the subsequent tour, "Prophecy" and "Death", with the former reappearing in the setlist in 2011–12.

Reception
Sputnikmusic said that with Nostradamus the band "has cast away both speed metal and hard rock in favour of a more symphonic metal approach", with the album having a "greater emphasis" on synthesizers, but not in the unsatisfying manner of their 1986 album Turbo. The reviewer said he thought it was "painfully obvious" that the band had been struggling to work in an unfamiliar style. Allmusic said that the album represented "epic metal" of the sort previously produced by Iron Maiden in 1988's Seventh Son of a Seventh Son. The album was seen to contain Spinal Tap-style clichés such as "melodramatic spoken interludes". "Dated" synthesizer string sounds added to the sense that the band was seeking filler material to make a double album, which "should have been" trimmed down to a single album. The album has sold over 100,000 copies in the US and 500,000 copies worldwide as of 2009.

Reflecting on the album in 2020 memoir Confess, Halford stated that he is fully proud of the album and feels that it will one day be recognised as a classic. He also hopes that Judas Priest will one day present the album in full as a live spectacle, having only played two tracks from the album on their 2008 tour.

Story line
Nostradamus centres on the life and times of the seer. The first disc details various forecasts he has about the future and the end of the world.

Track listing

Personnel
Credits adapted from liner notes:

Charts

Certifications

Release history

References

External links
 

2008 albums
Judas Priest albums
Concept albums
Rock operas
Epic Records albums
Cultural depictions of Nostradamus
Symphonic metal albums by British artists
Progressive metal albums by British artists